Antonin Hales (born 9 July 1992) is a Czech male canoeist who won 16 medals at individual senior level at the Wildwater Canoeing World Championships and European Wildwater Championships.

References

External links
 

1992 births
Living people
Czech male canoeists
Place of birth missing (living people)